Jarawa may refer to:

 Jarawas (Andaman Islands), one of the indigenous peoples of the Andaman Islands
Jarawa language (Andaman Islands)
 Jarawa (Berber tribe), a Berber tribal confederacy that flourished in northwest Africa during the seventh century
 Jarawa (Nigeria), an ethnic group in Plateau State, Nigeria
Jarawa language (Nigeria), a Bantoid language of Nigeria

See also
 Jarawan languages, a dialect cluster that is closely related to, or perhaps a branch of, the Bantu languages
Jawara, a surname
Jarwa, a village in Uttar Pradesh, India
INS Jarawa, a naval base in the Andaman Islands, India

Language and nationality disambiguation pages